Instant Sunshine is a comedy musical cabaret group who sing to an acoustic guitar accompaniment.  It was formed in 1966 by three doctors at St. Thomas' Hospital in London, Peter Christie, David Barlow and Alan Maryon-Davis.  In 1972 they were joined by the journalist and double bass player Miles Kington.  In 1998 Kington left the group and Tom Barlow joined in his place for several years.

Peter Christie is the leading spirit and writes the words and music. Their style has been compared to Flanders and Swann.  The lyrics typically have an element of surreal fantasy (one song begins "Our Budgie has Changed to an Orang-Utang"), while the tunes are usually wistful and mock-sentimental.  Their act contains an abundance of comic "business" and sound effects, usually provided by Alan Maryon-Davis.  They perform at music festivals or in cabaret at private bookings, and have played alternate years at the Edinburgh Fringe since 1975.  The group have also performed many songs for radio and television programmes, being particularly known for their regular contribution to BBC Radio 4's Stop The Week over a period of about ten years.  They provided the theme song for the BBC television version of Stephen Potter's Oneupmanship (1979), had three series of their own on Radio 4 (1985, 1986 and 1988) and a book "The Instant Sunshine Book - with hints for struggling supergroups" (Robson Books 1980). 

They produced five vinyl LPs: "Live at Tiddy Dols" (Page One 1968), "Instant Sunshine" (EMI 1976),  "Funny Name for a Band" (EMI 1977) "Reasonably Together Again" (EMI/One-Up 1979) and "The Instant Sunshine LP - Songs for struggling supergroups" (EMI/NTS 1980).  There are currently seven CDs in print, "Instant Sunshine Comes of Age" (Merlin Classics 1987), "Jubilee" (Merlin Classics 1992), "Live at the Old Vic" (Merlin Classics 2002), "50 Not Out" (Instant Sunshine 2017) and remixed versions of the EMI recordings "Instant Sunshine", "Funny Name for a Band" and "Reasonably Together Again" (all Instant Sunshine 2008).  The recordings are currently occasionally broadcast on BBC Radio 4 Extra and are available via the BBC iPlayer.

Song titles

Instant Sunshine (1976)
Worms
No News Today
When I was in Bombay
Metamorphosis ("Our budgie has changed to an Orang-Utang")
Ten-gallon Hat
Corduroy Trousers
Spanish Holiday
Top Dogs
I Wish I Was a Sassenach
Some Dancing
Don't Tell the Abbot
The Monster
Habeas Corpse
Herts is Trumps ("Tring")
Mrs Brown
Doctors
Fleeting Time

Funny Name for a Band (1977)
Sunshine
Nouveau Poor
The Blues
Kiddies' Olympics
Bar-stool Sailing
Flooding
Methylated
The Canary Song ("When you're working down a mine")
Bird Seed
Hurdey Gurdey
Now I'm Adolescent
Here We Go Again
Poor Guy
Tittle-tattle Rag
Talking Plants
Who Mowed the Lawns of Eden
The Demon in the Drink ("Salvation Army")
Sunshine (reprise)

Reasonably Together Again (1979)
Heathrow Holiday
A Very Tropical Subject
Tadpoles
On the Fringe
Kids on the Corner
My Lawn
Danish Bacon Baby
Boring Song
A Little Bit of Burgling on the Side
Ruthless Roues
Beefcake
Rabbikang
Lily Gilding
Allotment
Don't Eat a Turkey this Christmas
Our Show is Live

Instant Sunshine Comes of Age (1987)
The Parish Magazine
A Memorable Meal 
Smooth Train Blues
Yodelling Neurosis 
My Garden Shed 
My Dog Has Fleas
Every Body needs a Body
Wish You Were Here
Spring Collection 
Has Anyone Seen My Horse
At the Launderette 
Scat Like That 
Foreign Relations 
Conservation Conversation
Who Mowed the Lawns of Eden?
Never be Tempted by Water
Go Plastic 
Platform Three
Sorry 
Los Peckham Ryos

Jubilee (1992)
A Bouquet of Roes  
Whitehall Farce
What is a Thingummy-jig
Middlesex Man 
Pick up the Phone 
Eating Food is Wrong
Specs Appeal 
If I Keep on Whistling 
Shiny Leather Chair 
Who Dunnit 
Ideal Home 
Cucumber Sandwiches
Birds and Bees 
Holiday Survival 
Westminster Pier to Greenwich  
It Happened in the Park 
Equal Animal Rights 
Alas Poor Hamlet 
Mini Mozart
Listen to the Summer 
Fleeting Time

Live at the Old Vic (2002)
Sunshine 
Birdseed 
Platform Three 
Knitting for Victory 
Herts is Trumps
Smooth Train Blues 
The Euro
The Demon in the Drink 
Our Show is Live
Lots in the Attic
Lugubrious Lobster 
Who Mowed the Lawns of Eden 
My Horse and I (=Has Anyone Seen my Horse?)
Corduroy Trousers 
Kiddies Olympics 
Conservation Conversation

50 Not Out (2017)
Knitting for Victory
Dear Diary
My Caddy Said
Toy Sympathy
Very Tiny Brain
Weather is Never Quite Right
Awfully Keen on the Arts
I Wonder What It's Like To Be a Star
Old Times Back
Peace of Mind
Squidger
Aunt Agatha's Hat
Man From Pollock
Christmas Greetings 
Lots In The Attic 
Incurable Romantic 
Gondoliers.

Others including
Rambling Man 
Lords Pavilion 
Flibbertygibbet Flo
My Lavatory Lady
Fish and Chips
Look After Yourself
Money Box

Literature
Barlow, David (et al.) -  The Instant Sunshine Book with Hints for Struggling Supergroups (Robson Books, 1980)  - includes music and lyrics for songs from "The Instant Sunshine LP"

References

External links
Official Instant Sunshine website

British comedy musical groups